Richard Smith (2 February 1873 – 10 June 1954) was a Barbadian cricketer. He played in two first-class matches for the Barbados cricket team in 1893/94.

See also
 List of Barbadian representative cricketers

References

External links
 

1873 births
1954 deaths
Barbadian cricketers
Barbados cricketers
People from Saint George, Barbados